Nuria Ligero Fernández (born 4 September 1991), also known as Nana, is a Spanish footballer who plays as a defender for Real Betis.

Club career
Ligero started her career at Sevilla.

References

External links
Profile at La Liga

1991 births
Living people
Women's association football defenders
Spanish women's footballers
Footballers from Seville
Sevilla FC (women) players
Real Betis Féminas players
Primera División (women) players